Sarah Ann Leilani Merriam (born 1971) is an American attorney serving as a United States circuit judge of the United States Court of Appeals for the Second Circuit. She is a former United States magistrate judge of the United States District Court for the District of Connecticut and former district judge of the same court.

Early life and education 

Merriam was born in Honolulu, Hawaii, and raised in New Haven, Connecticut, where she attended the Hopkins School. She earned a Bachelor of Arts from Georgetown University in 1993, a Juris Doctor from Yale Law School in 2000, and a Master of Laws in judicial studies from the Duke University School of Law in 2018.

Career 

Merriam clerked for Judge Alvin Thompson of the United States District Court for the District of Connecticut from 2000 to 2002 and Judge Thomas Meskill of the United States Court of Appeals for the Second Circuit from 2002 to 2003. She began her career as an associate with Cowdery, Ecker & Murphy in Hartford, Connecticut. From 2007 to 2015, Merriam served as an assistant public defender for the United States District Court for the District of Connecticut.

Merriam was political director for a state employee union and helped manage the campaigns of two Democratic U.S. Senators, Chris Murphy and  Chris Dodd.

United States magistrate judge 

In March 2015, Merriam was selected as a magistrate judge of the District of Connecticut. She replaced Judge Holly B. Fitzsimmons, who retired. She was sworn in on April 3, 2015. Her service terminated on October 8, 2021 when she was elevated to a district court judge.

District court service 

On June 15, 2021, President Joe Biden nominated Merriam to serve as a United States district judge for the United States District Court for the District of Connecticut to the seat vacated by Judge Janet C. Hall, who assumed senior status on January 21, 2021. On July 14, 2021, a hearing on her nomination was held before the Senate Judiciary Committee. On August 5, 2021, her nomination was reported out of committee by a 13–9 vote. On October 6, 2021, the United States Senate invoked cloture on her nomination by a 53–47 vote. Her nomination was confirmed later that day by a 54–46 vote. She received her judicial commission on October 8, 2021. Her service as a district judge was terminated on September 28, 2022 when she was elevated to the United States Court of Appeals for the Second Circuit.

Court of appeals service 

On April 27, 2022, President Joe Biden announced he would nominate Merriam to serve as a United States circuit judge of the United States Court of Appeals for the Second Circuit. On May 19, 2022, her nomination was sent to the Senate. President Biden nominated Merriam to the seat to be vacated by Judge Susan L. Carney, who will assume senior status upon confirmation of a successor. On May 25, 2022, a hearing on her nomination was held before the Senate Judiciary Committee. On June 16, 2022, her nomination was reported out of committee by a 12–10 vote. On September 14, 2022, the United States Senate invoked cloture on her nomination by a 52–47 vote. On September 15, 2022, her nomination was confirmed by a 53–44 vote. She received her judicial commission on September 23, 2022.

References

External links 

1971 births
Living people
20th-century American women lawyers
20th-century American lawyers
21st-century American judges
21st-century American women judges
Connecticut lawyers
Duke University School of Law alumni
Georgetown University alumni
Judges of the United States District Court for the District of Connecticut
People from Honolulu
Public defenders
Judges of the United States Court of Appeals for the Second Circuit
United States court of appeals judges appointed by Joe Biden
United States district court judges appointed by Joe Biden
United States magistrate judges
Yale Law School alumni